Bratislava Transport Museum (Múzeum dopravy Bratislava) is a transport museum in Bratislava, Slovakia. It is a branch of the Slovak Technical Museum in Košice, is situated on the site of the first steam-railway station in Bratislava on Šancová Street, near the current main railway station in central Bratislava. It opened on June 24, 1999.

Collections and exhibits 

The two exhibition halls of the museum include just under 100 motorcars, 25 historical motorcycles and numerous technical accessories.

Vehicles in the collection date from the inter-war period up to the 1970s.  These include prototypes, military and government vehicles.

On the museum's railway tracks various steam and electrical locomotives are exhibited.

See also 
 Museum of Aviation, Košice - The other major transport museum branch of the Slovak Technical Museum.
List of museums in Slovakia
List of transport museums in Slovakia

References

External links
Official site
Further information (main Slovak Technical Museum site)

Museums in Bratislava
Museums established in 1999
Transport museums
1999 establishments in Slovakia